This is a partial list of Jupiter's  trojans (60° behind Jupiter) with numbers 300001–400000 .

300001–400000 

This list contains 378 objects sorted in numerical order.

top

References 
 

 Trojan_3
Jupiter Trojans (Trojan Camp)
Lists of Jupiter trojans